The Second Coming is the second studio album by American singer Adina Howard. It was released by Rufftown Records on April 6, 2004 in the United States. While being her third studio album, it was actually Howard's second album to be released in the United States and worldwide, thus the album title's reference. Two tracks from her 1997 shelved album, Welcome to Fantasy Island appear on this album, "T-Shirt & Panties" and "Crank Me Up".

Background
Following a hiatus from the music industry due to the difficulty Howard received in the shelving of her sophomore album Welcome to Fantasy Island by Elektra Records, she signed with the Rufftown Records and began work on a new album in 2002. Announcing the title Ride Again: 7/2 the album was set for an estimated July 2, 2003 release but was later delayed. Following another title change (Two Can Play That Game), Howard finally decided upon The Second Coming and it was released on April 6, 2004.

Promotion
"Nasty Grind" was released as the album's lead single and garnered notable airplay on Urban radio. The single's music video was inspired by D'Angelo's "Untitled (How Does It Feel)". A second single "Outside (The Club)" was planned, with a remix version premiering, but was later cancelled.

Critical reception

AllMusic rated the album two and a half stars out of five.

Chart performance
The Second Coming debut and peaked at number 61 on the US Top R&B/Hip-Hop Albums chart. The album failed to chart on the US Billboard 200.

Track listing

Charts

References 

Adina Howard albums
2004 albums
Albums produced by Missy Elliott